Pale Blue Dot is a photograph of Earth taken by the Voyager 1 space probe.

Pale Blue Dot may also refer to:
 Pale Blue Dot (book), a 1994 book by Carl Sagan
 Pale Blue Dot, a 1998 short film by Kim Tae-yong
 Lucy in the Sky, a 2019 drama film previously titled Pale Blue Dot
 Ferguson, Missouri

Music
 Pale Blue Dot (album), a 2008 album by Benn Jordan
 Pale Blue Dot EP, a 2012 EP by Mr. J. Medeiros
 "A Pale Blue Dot", a 2008 single by Red Snapper
 "A Pale Blue Dot", a 2013 single by The Prototypes
 "Pale Blue Dot (Interlude)", a 2008 song by Story of the Year
 "Pale Blue Dot" (Bliss n Eso song)
 "Pale Blue Dot"; a 2012 song by Sithu Aye.
 "Pale Blue Dot", a 2013 song by Sound of Contact
 "Pale Blue Dot", a 2015 song and video by DMK
 "Pale Blue Dot", a 2019 song by Dream Theater
 "Pale Blue Dot", a 2020 song by Red Vox
 "Pale Blue Dot", a 2022 song by Loona

See also

 
 Pale Red Dot
 Blue Dot (disambiguation)